

Public holidays in Denmark

Other special days
Some of these days derive from politics, and some from Roman Catholic traditions that predate the current national church. Some are simply the Scandinavian tradition of starting the celebrations of a special day on the evening before the actual day.

References

External links
 Official days to use the flag in Denmark (in Danish)
 Office Holidays in Denmark (specific dates of holidays in the current year)

 
Denmark
Public holidays
Public holidays
Holidays